Ferreyra is a surname meaning 'smith'. Notable people with the surname include:

 Alejandro Garnacho Ferreyra (born 2004), Argentine footballer
 Beatriz Ferreyra (born 1937), Argentine composer
 Bernabé Ferreyra (1909–1972), Argentine footballer
 Daniel Ferreyra (born 1982), Argentine football goalkeeper
 Darío Ferreyra (born 1997), Argentine footballer
 David Ferreyra Martínez (born 1973), Mexican politician
 Diego Ferreyra (born 1997), Chilean cyclist
 Facundo Ferreyra (born 1991), Argentine footballer
 Felipe Souza Ferreyra (born 1998), Brazilian footballer
 Fernando Ferreyra Olivares (born 1963), Mexican politician
 Gabriel Ferreyra (born 1994), Argentine footballer
 Germán Ferreyra (born 1996), Argentine footballer
 Gustavo Ferreyra (born 1972), Uruguayan retired footballer and manager
 Jeorá Matos Ferreira (born 1964), former Brazilian footballer
 José A. Ferreyra (1889–1943), Argentine film director, screenwriter and film producer
 Juan Carlos Giménez Ferreyra (born 1960), Paraguayan boxer
 Julio Ferreyra (born 1942), Argentine politician
 Leonardo Ferreyra (born 1991), Argentine footballer 
 Luciano Ferreyra (born 2002), Argentine footballer
 Luis Emilio de Souza Ferreira Huby (1908–2008), Peruvian footballer
 Luis Eduardo Barreto Ferreyra (1954–2011),Uruguayan comic book artist
 Malevo Ferreyra (Mario Oscar Ferreyra) (1945–2008),  Argentine police chief
 Mariano Ferreyra (1987–2010), Argentine student who was murdered
 Martín Ferreyra (born 1996), Argentine footballer
 Nicolás Ferreyra (born 1993), Argentine footballer
 Osmar Ferreyra (born 1983), Argentine former footballer
 Roque Ferreyra (1810–1885), Argentine politician
 Sergio Ferreyra (born 1977), Argentine former swimmer
 Victor Ferreyra (born 1964), Argentine former footballer